Jack A. Cutting (January 19, 1908 – August 17, 1988) was an American international content supervisor and animator for Walt Disney Animation Studios, where he worked for 46 years.

Biography 
Cutting was born on January 9, 1908, in New York City. He attended the Otis College of Art and Design, where he met Tyrus Wong, Wilfred Jackson, and John Hench and graduated in 1929. A friend referred him to the fledgling Walt Disney Studios, where he was hired to a group of 19 animators in August/September 1929. He worked alongside Walt Disney himself and made $18.00 a week, oftentimes working overtime without pay. He worked in several different departments, starting as an animator, moving up to director, then to assistant director; he was also Dave Hand's assistant. When the United States entered World War II, Disney submitted the necessary paperwork to waive his employees of their service so the company could direct training films for the army. Cutting headed the Editorial Department for a year during the war. Cutting was one of the several employees who played polo with Walt Disney; he also was sent to "scout for merry-go-rounds in Europe" after Disney had the idea for a theme park. In 1939, his film The Ugly Duckling won the 1940 Oscar in Best Short Subject (Cartoons).

After Snow White and the Seven Dwarfs was released, Cutting convinced Roy Disney to let him work with the man hired to dub the film; he quickly became a dubbing assistant and by 1938 was head of the Foreign Department at Disney. In this role, he supervised translation and dubbing efforts all over the world, traveling often to work with different teams. He oversaw the dubbing of and found voice actors for the Swedish Dumbo, the French Mary Poppins, and the Japanese One Hundred and One Dalmatians in Japanese. He was among the frontrunners for synchronizing sound and image. He held his position in the Foreign Department until his retirement in 1975.

Cutting and his wife Camille lived in Paris while Cutting worked with European markets. They had at least one son, Phil. Cutting died on August 17, 1988, in North Hollywood, California.

Filmography

External links

References

Walt Disney Animation Studios people
1908 births
1988 deaths
American animated film directors
Animators from New York (state)
Artists from New York City
Directors of Best Animated Short Academy Award winners